Jessica Pfund (born January 9, 1998) is a retired Swiss-American pair skater who represents Switzerland. With skating partner Joshua Santillan, she is the 2015 Autumn Classic International bronze medalist and has competed at two Grand Prix events. They are the 2022 Swiss national champions.

Career

Early career 
Pfund began learning to skate in 2003. As a single skater, she won the juvenile bronze medal at the 2009 U.S. Junior Championships and placed 12th on the novice level at the 2011 U.S. Championships.

In the 2011–12 season, Pfund began competing in pair skating with AJ Reiss. In 2012, they appeared at two Junior Grand Prix events, placing 5th in Lake Placid, New York and 7th in Chemnitz, Germany. Competing on the senior level, they placed tenth at the 2014 U.S. Championships. They were coached by Peter Oppegard in Artesia, California.

Partnership with Santillan 
Pfund teamed up with Joshua Santillan in May 2015, following tryouts in Florida and Colorado Springs, Colorado. They decided to be coached by Lyndon Johnston in Ellenton, Florida and, early in their partnership, also trained with Jim Peterson and Amanda Evora. Making their international debut, the pair won the bronze medal at the 2015 Autumn Classic International. Appearing as late replacements for Gretchen Donlan / Nathan Bartholomay, they finished 8th at their first Grand Prix event, the 2015 Skate America.

Pfund underwent surgery in mid-2016 due to two torn ligaments in her right foot and returned to the ice three months later. She and Santillan finished 8th at the 2016 Cup of China. Following the event, she had an amniotic stem cell injection to treat tendinitis in her anterior tendon and a bone cement injection for a chronic bruise in her talus bone. In January 2017, Santillan had a strained rotator cuff in his right shoulder. The pair placed 5th at the 2017 U.S. Championships.

In October 2020, Pfund and Santillan announced their intention to represent Switzerland in competition, but were told by the U.S. Figure Skating Federation that they would have to wait a year to be released. In July 2021, they announced they were allowed to represent Switzerland for the 2021-2022 season.

On March 18, 2022, they announced their retirement from competitive skating.

Programs

With Santillan

With Reiss

Competitive highlights 
GP: Grand Prix; CS: Challenger Series; JGP: Junior Grand Prix

Pairs with Santillan

For Switzerland

For the United States

Pairs with Reiss

Ladies' singles

References

External links 
 
 

1998 births
American female pair skaters
Living people
People from Los Gatos, California
21st-century American women